Badminton events at the 2018 Commonwealth Games on the Gold Coast, Australia took place between Thursday 5 April and Sunday 15 April at the Carrara Sports and Leisure Centre.

Badminton is one of ten core sports at the Commonwealth Games and has been continuously held at the Games since its first appearance at the 1966 British Empire and Commonwealth Games in Kingston, Jamaica. The badminton programme in 2018 included men's and women's singles competitions; men's, women's and mixed doubles competitions alongside a mixed team event throughout the 11 days of competition. The draw for the mixed team event was held on 6 February at The Star Gold Coast.

Schedule

Medal table

Medal summary

Participating nations
There are 29 participating associations in badminton with a total of 153 athletes.

References

External links
 Results Book – Badminton
 Badminton - 2018 Commonwealth Games at the www.tournamentsoftware.com

 
2018
Badminton
Commonwealth Games
2018 Commonwealth Games